

Aargau
 Museum Kloster Muri

Basel

 Antikenmuseum Basel und Sammlung Ludwig
 Historical Museum Basel
 Natural History Museum of Basel
 Skulpturhalle Basel
 Swiss Architecture Museum
See also Museums in Basel

Bern

Brienz

 Ballenberg

La Chaux-de-Fonds

 Musée International d'Horlogerie

Degersheim
 Dreamfactory & World of Wonders

Develier
 Musée Chappuis-Fähndrich

Fribourg
Bible and Orient Museum

Geneva
 Barbier-Mueller Museum
 Centre d’Art Contemporain Genève
 Centre pour l’Image Contemporaine
 Conservatory and Botanical Garden of the City of Geneva
 Institut et Musée Voltaire
 International Red Cross and Red Crescent Museum
 Musée Ariana
 Musée d'Art et d'Histoire
 Musée d'ethnographie de Genève
 Natural History Museum of Geneva
 Musée d'histoire des sciences de la Ville de Genève

Lausanne

 Archizoom (EPFL)
 Olympic Museum

Le Locle

 Musée d'Horlogerie du Locle

Lucerne

 Swiss Transport Museum

Lugano and Ticino

Martigny

 Fondation Pierre Gianadda

Neuchâtel

 Laténium

Rapperswil
 Stadtmuseum Rapperswil
 Polish Museum, Rapperswil

Sierre

 Rainer Maria Rilke Foundation

Thun

 Kunstmuseum Thun

Winterthur

 Oskar Reinhart Collection "Am Römerholz"
 Oskar Reinhart Museum
 Kunstmuseum Winterthur
 Swiss Science Center Technorama

Zermatt

 Matterhorn Museum

Zürich
 Pavillon Le Corbusier
 Foundation E.G. Bührle
 Haus Konstruktiv
 Kunsthaus Zürich
 No Show Museum
 North America Native Museum
 Rietberg Museum
 Swiss National Museum
 Uhrenmuseum zum Rösli
 Zunfthaus zur Meisen

See also
Basel
Berne
Lausanne
Lugano
St. Gallen
Zurich
Thun
La Chaux-de-Fonds
List of railway museums in Switzerland
Lists of tourist attractions in Switzerland

References

External links 
 Museums.ch

 
 
Switzerland